Six special routes of U.S. Route 169 exist, one each in Oklahoma, Kansas, Missouri, and Iowa, and two in Minnesota.

Nowata alternate route

U.S. 169 has one special route while in Oklahoma, US 169 Alternate. The alternate route travels through Nowata while the main highway bypasses the town.

Garnett business route

U.S. 169 has one special route while in  Kansas, Business Route 169. The business route northern terminus is the junction of U.S. 169 & 6th Avenue in Garnett. The main highway bypasses the town to the Southeast. The business route travels along 6th Avenue until reaching Maple Street where it intersects with U.S. 59 and K-31 until it ends at its intersection with U.S. 169 at a roundabout South of Garnett in Anderson County, Kansas.

Smithville spur

U.S. Route 169 Spur is a  route in Smithville, Missouri.  The spur route follows an old alignment of US 169 into the city center of Smithville ending at Main Street.

Fort Dodge business loop

U.S. Route 169 Business is a  business route in Fort Dodge, Iowa.  The route was established in 1990 along former sections of Iowa Highway 7 (Iowa 7) and U.S. Route 20.  Iowa 7 had recently been truncated to its current eastern end at U.S. Route 169 and US 20 had been rerouted onto a new freeway south of Fort Dodge.  Since both routes had viaducts over the Des Moines River, officials in Fort Dodge wanted the Iowa Department of Transportation to maintain the bridges.  From its creation until 2014, the route was officially known as Iowa Highway 926, but it was only signed as Business US 169.

Shakopee business route

U.S. Highway 169 Business is a business route in Shakopee, Minnesota.

Hibbing business route

U.S. Highway 169 Business is a business route in Hibbing, Minnesota.

References

69-1
 
69-1
69-1
69-1
S69-1
69-1